Uncle Meat is the fifth studio album by the Mothers of Invention, released as a double album in 1969. Uncle Meat was originally developed as a part of No Commercial Potential, a project which spawned three other albums sharing a conceptual connection: We're Only in It for the Money, Lumpy Gravy and Cruising with Ruben & the Jets.

The album also served as a soundtrack album to a proposed science fiction film which would not be completed, though a direct-to-video film containing test footage from the project was released by Frank Zappa in 1987. The music is diverse in style, drawing from orchestral, jazz, blues and rock music. Uncle Meat was a commercial success upon release, and has been highly acclaimed for its innovative recording and editing techniques, including experiments in manipulation of tape speed and overdubbing, and its diverse sound.

Background 

Frank Zappa, who had been interested in film since high school, decided to develop a film vehicle for the Mothers of Invention, titled Uncle Meat. The proposed film would combine elements of science fiction and road stories inspired by the band's sexual escapades. Subsequently, Zappa began working on a project called No Commercial Potential, which eventually became the albums We're Only in It for the Money, Lumpy Gravy, Cruising with Ruben & the Jets and Uncle Meat. Zappa stated, "It's all one album. All the material in the albums is organically related and if I had all the master tapes and I could take a razor blade and cut them apart and put it together again in a different order it still would make one piece of music you can listen to. Then I could take that razor blade and cut it apart and reassemble it a different way, and it still would make sense. I could do this twenty ways. The material is definitely related."

According to artist Cal Schenkel, "I started working on the story of Ruben and the Jets that is connected with the Uncle Meat story, which is this old guy turns this teenage band into these dog snout people ... We started that before it actually became Ruben and the Jets. That came out of my love for comics and that style, the anthropomorphic animals, but also it was part of a running story line."

Recording 

For the recording sessions, Zappa worked at Apostolic Studios in Manhattan employing an unusual and innovative 12-track machine built by Scully. Zappa included a large number of overdubs, playing unconventional instruments through studio effects, and speeding up or slowing down recordings for artistic effect. Zappa wanted to make an album that would challenge the complacency of contemporary music fans, as he felt that his fanbase was "accustomed to accepting everything that was handed to them ... politically, musically, sociallyeverything. Somebody would just hand it to them and they wouldn't question it. It was my campaign in those days to do things that would shake people out of that complacency, or that ignorance and make them question things."

Despite not actually playing on Uncle Meat, it having been recorded prior to his arrival, future Mothers rhythm guitarist and Little Feat founder Lowell George is featured in the album's artwork and booklet.

Music and lyrics 

Uncle Meat featured a variety of music styles, including orchestral symphonies, free jazz, blues, doo wop and rock and roll. The album also contains spoken word segments featuring Suzy Creamcheese, and features a stronger focus on percussion instrumentation than previous works by Zappa, as well as emphasizing his strengths as a composer and arranger.

"Nine Types of Industrial Pollution" is melodically formless, rooted in percussion instrumentation, and features a guitar solo that was sped up in post production. "Dog Breath, in the Year of the Plague" is delivered as a rock and roll song, with the same theme being repeated as an instrumental later in the album, performed by keyboards, percussion and acoustic guitar. The rock and roll version features three verses with the first chorus being delivered by opera singer Nelcy Walker, and the second chorus featuring sped up vocals. After the third verse, the song becomes an avant garde orchestral piece performed by percussion, keyboards and instruments; the album liner notes "The weird middle section of DOG BREATH (after the line "Ready to attack") has forty tracks built into it. Things that sound like trumpets are actually clarinets played through an electric device made by Maestro with a setting labeled Oboe D'Amore and sped up a minor third with a V.S.O. (variable speed oscillator). Other peculiar sounds were make[sic] on a Kalamazoo electric organ. The only equipment at our disposal for the modification of these primary sounds was a pair of Pultec Filters, two [Lang Equalizers], and three Melchor Compressors built into the mixing console. The board itself is exceptionally quiet and efficient (the only thing that allowed us to pile up so many tracks) and is the product of Mr. Lou Lindauer's imagination & workmanship."

In addition to the studio recordings, Uncle Meat featured live recordings made at the Royal Albert Hall, including a recording of Don Preston playing "Louie Louie" on the Albert Hall pipe organ, at the end of which Zappa announces it as having been performed by the "London Philharmonic Orchestra". The doo wop-influenced "Electric Aunt Jemima" refers to Zappa's guitar amplifier, equating it with the advertising character Aunt Jemima. Zappa explained, "I get kind of a laugh out of the fact that other people are going to try to interpret that stuff and come up with some grotesque interpretations of it. It gives me a certain amount of satisfaction."

The album concludes with "King Kong", a piece in 3/8, although the instrumental's prelude, a free jazz improvisation over a rhythm section playing in a 5/8 time signature, occurs much earlier in the album. Six variations of the melody appear as the album's finale, with the first establishing its simple melody, the second being a Fender Rhodes Electric Piano solo by Preston, the third showcasing a saxophone solo by Motorhead Sherwood, and the fourth featuring Bunk Gardner playing a soprano saxophone through various electronic effects that emulate the sound of a contrabassoon doubling his solo lines.  Two more variations conclude the piece, which include a live recorded performance featuring a saxophone solo by Ian Underwood and then finally ending with a version with sped up gongs, overblown saxophones and other instruments.

Release and reception 

Uncle Meat was released as a double album by Bizarre and Reprise Records, subtitled, "Most of the music from the Mothers' movie of the same name which we haven't got enough money to finish yet."

Critical reception 

Contemporary reviews of the album were highly favorable, recognizing it as an important album in Zappa's discography. The New Rolling Stone Album Guide described the album as an "inspired monstrosity ... [an] assault of glorious noise". AllMusic writer Steve Huey wrote, "despite the absence of a conceptual framework, the unfocused sprawl of Uncle Meat is actually a big part of its appeal. It's exciting to hear one of the most creatively fertile minds in rock pushing restlessly into new territory, even if he isn't always quite sure where he's going."

Legacy 

In 1987, a completed Uncle Meat film was released on home video, and the Uncle Meat album was subsequently reissued as a double CD which included a song recorded in 1982, "Tengo Na Minchia Tanta", sung in Sicilian and Italian by Massimo Bassoli, who identifies the song as being translated as "I've Got a Big Bunch Of Dick", and over 40 minutes' worth of soundbites and dialogue from the film. The track listing programs the new tracks at the beginning of the second disc, placing the material between the album's original third and fourth sides.  The original 1969 vinyl mix was reissued in 2016 as part of the Meat Light audio documentary box set.

Track listing

Personnel

Musicians 
The Mothers – at the time of this recording were:
 Frank Zappa – guitar, low grade vocals, percussion
 Ray Collins – swell vocals
 Jimmy Carl Black – drums, droll humor, poverty
 Roy Estrada – electric bass, cheeseburgers, Pachuco falsetto
 Don (Dom De Wild) Preston – electric piano, tarot cards, brown rice
 Billy (The Oozer) Mundi – drums on some pieces before he quit to join RHINOCEROS
 Bunk (Sweetpants) Gardner – piccolo, flute, clarinet, bass clarinet, soprano sax, alto sax, tenor sax, bassoon (all of these electric and/or no-electric depending)
 Ian Underwood – electronic organ, piano, harpsichord, celeste, flute, clarinet, alto sax, baritone sax, special assistant, copyist, industrial relations & teen appeal
 Artie (With the Green Mustache) Tripp – drums, timpani, vibes, marimba, xylophone, wood blocks, bells, small chimes, cheerful outlook & specific inquiries
 Euclid James (Motorhead/Motorishi) Sherwood – pop star, frenetic tenor sax stylings, tambourine, choreography, obstinance & equipment setter-upper when he's not hustling local groupies

Special thanks to:
 Ruth Komanoff – who plays marimba and vibes with Artie on many of the tracks, and
 Nelcy Walker – the soprano voice with Ray & Roy on "Dog Breath" & "The Uncle Meat Variations".
Uncredited:
 Pamela Zarubica as Suzy Creamcheese
 Buzz Gardner, trumpet and flugel horn (name appears on back cover along with Lowell George).

Production 
 Frank Zappa – producer
 Jerry Hansen – engineer
 Euclid James Sherwood – equipment technician, choreographer
 Art Tripp – adviser
 Cal Schenkel – package design
 Roy Estrada – prop design
 Ian Underwood – copyist, public relations, special assistance

Charts 
Album – Billboard (United States)

References

1969 albums
Albums produced by Frank Zappa
Bizarre Records albums
Concept albums
Jazz fusion albums by American artists
Reprise Records albums
The Mothers of Invention albums
Albums recorded at Sunset Sound Recorders